Cyphonanthus is a genus of flowering plants belonging to the family Poaceae.

Its native range is Central America to Guianas, Cuba.

Species:
 Cyphonanthus discrepans (Döll) Zuloaga & Morrone

References

Poaceae
Poaceae genera